My Angel is a 2004 French-Belgian drama film directed by Serge Frydman.

Cast 
 Vanessa Paradis - Colette
 Vincent Rottiers - Billy
 Eduardo Noriega - Romain
  - Kovarski
 Claude Perron - Peggy
 Jo Deseure as Berg
 Thomas Fersen - Client café
 Anne-Marie Loop - Guichetière
  - Client oreillons
  - Type voiture

References

External links 

2004 drama films
2004 films
2000s French-language films
French-language Belgian films
French drama films
Belgian drama films
2000s French films